Vermont Route 279 (VT 279), often referred to as the Bennington Bypass, is a two and three-lane undivided northwest bypass of Bennington in Bennington County, Vermont, in the United States. At its west end, VT 279 connects to New York State Route 915G (NY 915G), an unsigned reference route leading to NY 7 in Hoosick, New York.

The section of VT 279 west of U.S. Route 7 (US 7) officially opened to traffic in 2004; however, portions of the route have been open in some capacity since the 1970s. An extension of VT 279 southeast to VT 9 was completed in 2012, and planning is underway on another extension to US 7 south of downtown Bennington.

Route description

VT 279 begins at the New York–Vermont state line, where the road continues west to NY 7 in Hoosick, New York, as NY 915G, a reference route signed as "To VT 279" eastbound and "To NY 7" westbound. As VT 279, the highway heads northeast from the state line, passing through rural northwest Bennington as a three-lane road. It bypasses William H. Morse State Airport to the north and passes over a pair of local roadways on its way toward downtown Bennington, where the route crosses the Walloomsac River and meets VT 67A at a parclo interchange north of downtown.

Past VT 67A, the bypass widens to four lanes and becomes a divided highway as it passes over VT 7A and approaches a complex interchange with US 7. The route briefly overlaps with the limited-access highway before continuing eastward as a two-lane highway toward the western edge of Green Mountain National Forest. After , VT 279 turns southward, loosely paralleling the forest's west boundary as it bypasses the northeastern section of downtown Bennington. The route crosses the Roaring Branch of the Walloomsac River before ending at a half-completed single-point urban interchange (SPUI) with VT 9 east of downtown.

History

The four-lane portion of VT 279 between VT 67A and US 7 was built in the early 1970s and designated VT 67A Connector in 1974. However, construction did not begin on the remainder of the route west of VT 67A (including the short continuation into Hoosick, New York) until the early 2000s. Work on the bypass concluded with the opening of VT 279 on October 12, 2004. The number "279" was chosen because it provides a bypass for both US 7 and VT 9.

Construction on an extension of VT 279 southeast to VT 9 began in July 2007. The highway was built as a two-lane undivided roadway, similar to that constructed between Hoosick and Bennington. It was officially opened on August 30, 2012, and cost roughly $70 million to build. Construction plans for the northern segment called for the existing interchange between US 7 and VT 279 to be reconfigured to accommodate a welcome center located within the exit that was completed and officially opened on October 11, 2013.

Future
As recently as 2017, the Vermont Agency of Transportation (VTrans) was planning on extending the Bennington Bypass (VT 279) southwestward from the interchange with VT 9 to US 7 south of downtown Bennington. The partial SPUI with VT 9 would be completed as part of the project, which is currently in the design stage.

Exit list
This list includes VT 279's continuation into New York as NY 915G.

See also

List of reference routes in New York

References

External links

VT 279 at Alps' Roads

279
Bennington, Vermont
Transportation in Bennington County, Vermont